The Cheradi Islands (Italian: Isole Cheradi) in the Gulf of Taranto are a small archipelago of the harbor basin of the Mar Grande of Taranto. The island group consists of the two islands of San Pietro and San Paolo. Previously, there was still a third island, San Nicolicchio, but was destroyed through the expansion of the cargo port. Administratively, the islands belong to the old town of Taranto (municipality III Città Vecchia - Borgo).

See also
 List of islands of Italy

References 

Islands of Apulia
Archipelagoes of Italy